{{DISPLAYTITLE:Isopropanol dehydrogenase (NADP+)}}

In enzymology, an isopropanol dehydrogenase (NADP+) is an enzyme that catalyzes the chemical reaction

propan-2-ol + NADP+  acetone + NADPH + H+

Thus, the two substrates of this enzyme are propan-2-ol and NADP+, whereas its 3 products are acetone, NADPH, and H+.

This enzyme belongs to the family of oxidoreductases, specifically those acting on the CH-OH group of donor with NAD+ or NADP+ as acceptor. The systematic name of this enzyme class is propan-2-ol:NADP+ oxidoreductase. This enzyme is also called isopropanol dehydrogenase (NADP+). This enzyme participates in propanoate metabolism.

References

 
 

EC 1.1.1
NADPH-dependent enzymes
Enzymes of known structure